NFL Football is an American football video game for the Atari Lynx. It was developed by Blue Sky Software, and published by Epyx in 1992.

Gameplay 

The Lynx system is to be rotated for vertical orientation in the player's hands, with the display zooming in and out from an overhead perspective. For two-player mode, a computer opponent is available or two Lynx systems can be connected via a cable. The players can choose a team from either the AFC or the NFC. The game offers an extensive clipboard of plays and formations "designed by a real NFL coordinator".

Development and release

Reception 

NFL Football on the Atari Lynx received overall negative reviews for being an incomplete game made of buggy software. Electronic Gaming Monthly had four reviewers of the game, rating it 4, 6, 5, and 6. Between them, they said the game lacks focus, and has a poor implementation with difficult player control and choppy graphics. Robert A. Jung scored it at 4 out of 10, summarizing that "It doesn't help if football games on other portable game systems are no more sophisticated than NFL Football. The bottom line is that this game is a futile exercise in boredom, and is certainly not fun to play nor worth the price asked for it."

References

External links 
 NFL Football at AtariAge
 NFL Football at GameFAQs
 NFL Football at MobyGames

1992 video games
Atari Lynx games
Atari Lynx-only games
BlueSky Software games
National Football League video games
Video games developed in the United States
Multiplayer and single-player video games